Lynn Gilbert (born January 7, 1938) is a photographer and author best known for her portraits of illustrious women from the 1920s to the 1980s and her documentation of Turkish homes and interiors.

Life and career 
Gilbert grew up in New York and attended Sarah Lawrence College, Bronxville, NY, Bachelor of Arts (Art History) 1959 and the Fashion Institute of Technology, New York, NY, Bachelor of Science (Fashion Design) 1962.

Gilbert began her career as a photographer documenting the lives of her children in the 1960s, and used the camera to comment on socio-economic diversity with the photographic portraits of others’ children. Her interest in portraiture developed into a series titled “Illustrious Women” that became the photographic accompaniment of the book of oral biographies, Particular Passions: Talks with Women Who Shaped Our Times, published 1981. The book recounts the rich oral histories of forty-two pioneering women of the twentieth century from the arts and sciences, athletics and law, mathematics and politics, and includes the portraits and oral biographies of such notable women as Betty Friedan, Gloria Steinem, Ruth Bader Ginsburg, Julia Child and Billie Jean King, Diana Vreeland.

Extensive travel to Turkey and Uzbekistan produced a photographic record of the historic home of the area, exhibited widely in Turkey, and recorded in the book, The Silk Road: Then and Now (2) published 2015. The book records traditional homes of Turkey located along the ancient Silk Road, homes both humble and affluent, with a mix of furniture, art, linens, household serving items and vibrantly colored, centuries-old handwoven rugs. Her images are governed by design, color, balance and light.

Exhibitions 
Children in Repose is Gilbert's photographic series of children from more than 100 families of varying socio-economic backgrounds in New York City in the mid 1970s.
Lynn Gilbert's photographs of Turkey have been widely exhibited in Turkey and at the Godwin-Ternbach Museum in Queens. Her portraits are part of the permanent collection of The National Portrait Gallery, Washington DC.
Gilbert is a contributing writer to the Turkish magazine, Cornucopia.

References

External links 

Living people
1938 births
American women writers
20th-century American photographers
Sarah Lawrence College alumni
Fashion Institute of Technology alumni
20th-century American women photographers
21st-century American women